The 2015–16 season was the club's 3rd season in the Scottish Premiership and their fourth consecutive appearance in the top flight of Scottish football. Ross County also competed in the League Cup and the Scottish Cup.

On 13 March 2016, Ross County won their first ever major trophy when they beat Hibernian 2–1 in the final of the 2015–16 Scottish League Cup.

Results and fixtures

Pre season / Friendlies

Scottish Premiership

Scottish League Cup

Scottish Cup

Squad statistics
During the 2015–16 season, Ross County used twenty-seven different players in competitive games. The table below shows the number of appearances and goals scored by each player.

Appearances

|-
|colspan="12"|Players who left the club during the 2015–16 season
|-

|}

Goalscorers

Disciplinary record

Team statistics

League table

Results by round

Management statistics

Transfers

In

Out

See also
 List of Ross County F.C. seasons

Notes

References

Ross County
Ross County F.C. seasons